Goniophotometry or goniometric optical scatter measurement is the technique of measuring the angular distribution of light, possibly wavelength-dependent, scattered from a surface.

Goniophotometry is used to measure intensity distributions from lamps and luminaries and to evaluate the gloss of paints and other surface finishes.

References

 ASTM E2387-19 "Standard Practice for Goniometric Optical Scatter Measurements" 

Scattering, absorption and radiative transfer (optics)